Jacob Olorunwa Adebanjo (born 5 September 1993) is a Nigerian professional footballer who plays as a defender or defensive midfielder.

Honours
Vitória Setúbal
Taça de Portugal: Runner-up 2017–18

References

External links
 
 
 
 
 
 Jacob Adebanjo at zerozero.pt
 Jacob Adebanjo at lpf.ro

1993 births
Living people
Sportspeople from Lagos
Nigerian footballers
Association football midfielders
Campeonato de Portugal (league) players
S.C. Farense players
C.D.R. Quarteirense players
AD Oliveirense players
Primeira Liga players
Vitória F.C. players
Merelinense F.C. players
Liga I players
Sepsi OSK Sfântu Gheorghe players
Nigerian expatriate footballers
Nigerian expatriate sportspeople in Portugal
Expatriate footballers in Portugal
Nigerian expatriate sportspeople in Romania
Expatriate footballers in Romania